Zoran Perušina (born 13 April 1970) is a Yugoslav alpine skier. He competed in four events at the 1992 Winter Olympics.

References

1970 births
Living people
Yugoslav male alpine skiers
Olympic alpine skiers of Yugoslavia
Alpine skiers at the 1992 Winter Olympics
Place of birth missing (living people)